Kuk may refer to:

Places 

 Kuk, Tomislavgrad, a village in Bosnia and Herzegovina
 Kûk or Kuuk, a former settlement in Greenland
 Kuk Swamp, an archaeological site in New Guinea
 Kuk, Tolmin, a settlement in Slovenia
 Kuk River, in Alaska, United States
 Mount Kuk, a mountain in Slovenia

Other uses 
Georg Kükenthal (1864–1955), German pastor and botanist with standard botanical author abbreviation Kük
Heung Yee Kuk, an advisory body for the New Territories, Hong Kong, colloquially known as "The Kuk" 
Kaiserlich und königlich ("imperial and royal", abbreviated k.u.k.), referring to the Austro-Hungarian Empire, or the Court of the Habsburgs
Kasigluk Airport (IATA: KUK), Alaska, United States
Kek (mythology) or Kuk, the deification of the primordial concept of darkness in ancient Egyptian mythology
Kepo' language (ISO 639-3: kuk), a possible language of Indonesia
Kuk language (ISO 639-3: kfn), a language of Cameroon
Kurukshetra University, Kurukshetra, Haryana, India
A Norwegian slang word and Swedish slang word for male genitalia

See also
, including many personal names 
Kukh (disambiguation)